Debra Todd (born October 15, 1957) is the chief justice of the Supreme Court of Pennsylvania. Prior to her election to the Supreme Court in 2007, she served as a judge on the Superior Court of Pennsylvania from 2000 through 2007. She is a member of the Democratic Party.

Formative years and family
Born in Ellwood City, Pennsylvania on October 15, 1957 as Debra McCloskey, Debra Todd is a daughter of Harry and Blanche McCloskey. She and her sisters, Mary and Nancy, were reared in that Wayne Township borough, which is located in Lawrence County. Their father was a steelworker.

She is married to Stephen K. Todd, a former attorney for the United States Army who retired from the U.S. Army Reserve at the rank of colonel, and who had been an attorney for U.S. Steel for thirty-one years before retiring in 2007 as vice president of law and environmental affairs.

Education

A 1975 graduate of Lincoln High School in Ellwood City, Todd was awarded a Bachelor of Arts degree with honors from Chatham College in 1979, served on the Law Review in 1982 at the University of Pittsburgh School of Law in Pittsburgh, Pennsylvania, where she earned her Juris Doctor that same year, and was then awarded a Master of Laws from the University of Virginia School of Law in 2004.

Legal career

Todd worked in private practice from 1982 to 1999. During the fall of 1999, she ran for, and was elected to the position of, judge on the Superior Court of Pennsylvania, serving from January 17, 2000, to December 31, 2007. She was elected to the Supreme Court of Pennsylvania in 2007. 

On May 19, 2017, Todd delivered the Charles Widger School of Law’s 2017 Commencement Address at Villanova University, and was also awarded the Villanova Law Medallion Award in recognition of her achievements.

On October 1, 2022, she became the first female chief justice of the state Supreme Court, replacing Max Baer who died a day earlier. Roughly three weeks later, she issued her first major letter to Pennsylvania attorneys, in which she urged them to support pro bono legal work across the Commonwealth of Pennsylvania.

Publications
Todd's list of publications includes:

Report and Recommendations of the Pennsylvania Supreme Court Elder Law Task Force (Chair), 2014 
“Sentencing of Adult Offenders in Crimes Involving the Sexual Abuse of Children, Too Little, Too Late? A View from the Pennsylvania Bench.” 109 Penn State Law Review 487, 2004

Awards and honors

Todd has been the recipient of the following awards:

Susan B. Anthony Award for promoting equality in the legal profession, Women’s Bar Association of Western Pennsylvania, 2017 
Visionary Award in recognition of an individual who has made a significant impact in the lives of survivors of sexual violence, Pittsburgh Action Against Rape, 2016 
Judge Robert E. Dauer Award for Judicial Leadership and Excellence, Amen Corner, 2015 
225th Anniversary Medallion recognizing alumni who have built better lives through their life’s work, University of Pittsburgh, 2013 
Marjorie Matson Woman of the Year Award, Women's Association, University of Pittsburgh School of Law, 2013 
Tribute to Women Leadership Award in Business & Professional Services, Greater Pittsburgh YWCA, 2013 
Distinguished Alumni Award, University of Pittsburgh Law Alumni Association, 2012 
Philip Werner Amram Award for Professional Excellence, Allegheny County Bar Association, 2010 
Cornerstone Award for Law, Chatham University, 2009 
Honorary Doctorate in Public Service, Chatham University, 2008
Celebrate & Share Women of Achievement Award, 2008 
Woman of the Year Award, The Legal Intelligencer Women in the Profession, 2007-2008 
Woman of the Year, Pennsylvania Federation of Democratic Women, 2007

References

External links 
Superior Court Profile
Debra Todd Project Vote Smart Profile
Debra Todd Smart Voter Profile

1957 births
20th-century American lawyers
21st-century American judges
21st-century American lawyers
21st-century American women judges
Chatham University alumni
Chief Justices of Pennsylvania
Living people
Judges of the Superior Court of Pennsylvania
Justices of the Supreme Court of Pennsylvania
Pennsylvania Democrats
People from Ellwood City, Pennsylvania
University of Pittsburgh School of Law alumni
University of Virginia School of Law alumni
Women chief justices of state supreme courts in the United States